Messier 85 (also known as M85 or NGC 4382 or PGC 40515 or ISD 0135852) is a lenticular galaxy, or elliptical galaxy for other authors, in the Coma Berenices constellation. It is 60 million light-years away, and it is estimated to be 125,000 light-years across.

It was discovered by Pierre Méchain in 1781. It is within the outskirts of the Virgo cluster, and is relatively isolated.

Properties 
M85 is extremely poor in neutral hydrogen and has a very complex outer structure with shells and ripples that are thought to have been caused by a merger with another galaxy that took place between 4 and 7 billion years ago, as well as a relatively young (<3 billion years old) stellar population on its centermost region, some of it in a ring, that may have been created by a late starburst. Like other massive, early-type galaxies, it has different populations of globular clusters. Aside from the typical "red" and "blue" populations, there is also a population with intermediate colors and an even redder population. It is likely transitioning from being a lenticular galaxy into an elliptical galaxy.

While indirect methods imply that Messier 85 should contain a central supermassive black hole of around 100 million solar masses,
velocity dispersion observations imply that the galaxy may entirely lack a central massive black hole.

The type I supernova, 1960R was discovered in M85 on December 20, 1960 and reached an apparent magnitude of 11.7 (its effect in the telescope-resolvable sky to outshine most red dwarves a million times closer).

This galaxy has also been the host of the first luminous red nova identified as such, M85 OT2006-1. It was discovered on January 7 of 2006 and took place on the outskirts of this galaxy.

On 25 June 2020, the ATLAS telescope in Hawaii spotted a type Ia supernova 2020nlb in M85, which reached a peak magnitude of 12.0. 

M85 is interacting with the nearby spiral galaxy NGC 4394, and a small elliptical galaxy called MCG 3-32-38.

Compared to other early-type galaxies, M85 emits a relatively smaller proportion of X-rays.

See also
 List of Messier objects

References

External links 

 
 SEDS Lenticular Galaxy M85
 

Lenticular galaxies
Virgo Cluster
Coma Berenices
085
NGC objects
07508
40515
Astronomical objects discovered in 1781